Learn to Talk / Country of Blinds is a CD compilation album by American experimental rock and jazz band Skeleton Crew. It was released by RecRec Music in 1990 and comprises the band's two studio albums, Learn to Talk and The Country of Blinds, with two tracks omitted from the former album, and one track omitted from the latter.

In 2005 Fred Records reissued the compilation on a double CD, omitting only one track from The Country of Blinds, and adding ten live tracks taken from the band's North American and European tours, nine of which were previously unreleased. This reissue was dedicated by Fred Frith to Tom Cora, who died in 1998: "Dedicated to the memory of Tom Cora – dear friend, master musician and enthusiastic co-conspirator."

Track listing

RecRec Music single-CD (1990)

Tracks 1–11 are from the original Learn to Talk album
Tracks 12–21 are from the original The Country of Blinds album

Fred Records double-CD (2005)

Tracks 1–13 are from the original Learn to Talk album
Track 17 was previously released on Passed Normal Vol. 4 (1991) by various artists

Tracks 1–10 are from the original The Country of Blinds album
Track 12 was previously released on A Classic Guide to No Man's Land (1988) by various artists

Track notes
"Victoryville" was recorded live in December 1983 at the 1st Festival International de Musique Actuelle de Victoriaville in Victoriaville, Quebec, Canada (additional material from a malfunctioning tape-recorder which played both sides of the tape at once).
Part of "Learn to Talk" recorded by CKRL in Quebec City.
"Sick as a Parrot" and "Automatic Pilot" were recorded live in Lyon, France, 1984
"Hook" was recorded live in Paris, France, 1982, and included Dave Newhouse on alto saxophone and percussion
"Killing Time" (originally recorded by Massacre in 1981) was recorded live at Illinois State University, Normal, Illinois, November 4, 1984
"Hot Field" and the last section of "You May Find a Bed" were recorded live in Reykjavík, Iceland, November 4, 1985.
"Sparrow Song", "Safety in Numbers", "Howdywhoola Too" (cello/sampler/persussion solo by Tom Cora) and "Second Rate" were recorded live on their 1985 European tour
"New Orleans Stomp" was recorded live at CBGB, New York City, April 1985
"Hasta la Victoria" was recorded live in Toronto, 1985

Personnel
Tom Cora – cello, bass guitar, Casio, accordion, drums, contraptions, singing
Fred Frith – guitar, 6-string bass guitar, violin, Casio, home-mades, drums, singing
Zeena Parkins – organ, electric harp, accordion, drums, singing
Dave Newhouse – alto saxophone and percussion on "Hook"

Guests
Röbl, Lu and Katrin – voices on "Los Colitos"

Sound and production
Learn to Talk
Engineered by Robert Vogel and Fred Frith
Produced by Robert Vogel and Skeleton Crew
The Country of Blinds
Engineered by Tim Hodgkinson and Katrina Brändli
Produced by Tim Hodgkinson
Additional live tracks on Fred Records release
Archival transfers from cassette to CD by Vance Galloway and Jon Leidecker, September 2000
Compiled and mastered by Fred Frith and Myles Boisen, January and May 2005

References

External links

Learn to Talk / Country of Blinds liner notes at Discogs

1990 compilation albums
2005 compilation albums
Experimental music compilation albums
RecRec Music compilation albums
Fred Records compilation albums